Vlci Žilina is a professional Slovak ice hockey club based in Žilina. They currently play in the Slovak 1. Liga. The club has won the Slovak league championship in 2006. The team is nicknamed Vlci, it means Wolves in English.

History
The club was founded on 25 January 1925 as ŠK Žilina. They played first official game against Slávia Banská Bystrica on 16 December 1928. Žilina was beaten 0–3. They competed in the Championship of Central Slovakia before and during World War II. In the 1931–32 season they won this championship. After WW II and restored Czechoslovakia they played in the Czechoslovak Extraliga two seasons. Žilina finished last in the 1951–52 season and the 1952–53 season. They won the 1964–65 1. SNHL season and promoted to the qualification for the Czechoslovak Extraliga. In the qualification round they lost all games and did not promote. After dissolution of Czechoslovakia they were included  to the Slovak 1.Liga, second level of Slovak hockey. Žilina won the 2000–01 Slovak 1.Liga season and promoted to the Slovak Extraliga first time. In the 2005–06 season they reached the most remarkable success. Žilina won the Slovak Extraliga first time after beating HK Poprad 4–3 in the final series. Michal Hreus was the top scorer of Žilina in the playoffs, recording 15 points (7G+8A). Through the victory in Extraliga they gained an option to play with the best European ice hockey teams in the IIHF European Champions Cup. Žilina was defeated 0–7 by HPK in first game but then won 4–2 against HC Sparta Praha and finished second in the Ragulin division.

In the 2018–19 season, Žilina were relegated to the Slovak 1. Liga after losing a best-of-seven relegation playoff to HK Dukla Michalovce.

Club's 100-percent shareholders, the City of Žilina, had sold the shares to a private company Lupiza in May 2020. The new owners had intended to rename the club to HK Vlci Žilina.

Honours

Domestic

Slovak Extraliga
  Winners (1): 2005–06
  3rd place (1): 2016–17

Slovak 1. Liga
  Winners (2): 2000–01, 2021–22
  Runners-up (2): 1998–99, 2020–21

Slovak Hockey League
  3rd place (1): 1940–41

1st. Slovak National Hockey League
  Winners (1): 1964–65
  3rd place (2): 1965–66, 1967–68

Pre-season
Rona Cup
  Winners (1): 2006

References

External links
Official club website 

Žilina
Zilina, MsHK
Zilina, MsHK
Ice hockey clubs established in 1925
1925 establishments in Czechoslovakia
Sport in Žilina Region